Spektrum was a Norwegian literary, art and cultural magazine, issued from 1946 to 1954. Its first editors were Carl Fredrik Engelstad and Hans Peter L'Orange, and from 1949 Ernst Sørensen, with Aasmund Brynildsen and Barthold A. Butenschøn as co-editors. Among contributors to the magazine were André Bjerke, Jens Bjørneboe, Karl Brodersen and Øistein Parmann. The magazine was based in Oslo.

References

1946 establishments in Norway
1954 disestablishments in Norway
Bi-monthly magazines
Cultural magazines
Defunct literary magazines published in Europe
Defunct magazines published in Norway
Magazines established in 1946
Magazines disestablished in 1954
Magazines published in Oslo
Norwegian-language magazines
Literary magazines published in Norway
Visual arts magazines